The Austrian Handball Federation (ÖHB) is the national organization responsible for managing and promoting the practice of handball and beach handball in Austria. Its head office is located in Vienna. ÖHB was founded on 25 January 1925 and is affiliated to the International Handball Federation, European Handball Federation and Austrian Olympic Committee. Current president of ÖHB is Mr. Gerhard Hofbauer, who held the position since 1996. Mr. Martin Hausleitner is current secretary general of ÖHB.

Competitions
 Handball Liga Austria
 Women Handball Liga Austria

National teams

Handball
 Austria men's national handball team
 Austria men's national junior handball team
 Austria men's national youth handball team
 Austria women's national handball team
 Austria women's national junior handball team
 Austria women's national youth handball team

Beach Handball
 Austria national beach handball team
 Austria women's national beach handball team

References

External links
Official website
Austrian Handball Federation at IHF site

Handball
Handball in Austria
1925 establishments in Austria
Sports organizations established in 1925
Handball governing bodies